This is a list of Cal Poly Mustangs football players in the NFL Draft.

Key

Selections

References

Cal Poly

Cal Poly Mustangs in the NFL Draft
Cal Poly Mustangs NFL Draft